Potter County is  a county in the Commonwealth of Pennsylvania. As of the 2020 census, its population was 16,396, making it the fifth-least populous county in Pennsylvania. Its county seat is Coudersport. The county was created in 1804 and later organized in 1836. It is named after James Potter, who was a general from Pennsylvania in the Continental Army during the American Revolution.  Due to its remoteness and natural environment, it has been nicknamed “God's Country”. 

Potter County is located in the Allegheny Plateau and Susquehanna Valley region.

History
Major Isaac Lyman, an American Revolutionary war veteran was one of the first permanent settlers in Potter County. Major Lyman is recognized as the founder of Potter County. He was paid $10 for each settler he convinced to move to Potter County. He built his home in 1809 in nearby Lymansville, now known as Ladona, just east of Coudersport along Rt. 6. Major Lyman also built the first road to cross Potter County and Potter County's first sawmill and gristmill.

Lyman had a colorful personal history. After the death in childbirth of his first wife, Sally Edgecombe, he remarried; later, he left his second wife and started a third family in Potter County. The second Mrs. Lyman was determined not to suffer on her own. She sought out the major, travelling from Bolton Landing, New York, to Potter County with the help of their son, Burrell, who was 18 at the time. Major Lyman lived with these two families in Potter County. Historical accounts of the living situation vary. Some say that Lyman kept both wives under one roof. Others state that two log homes for the families were on the same piece of property. Descendants of Major Lyman's three families still live and work in Potter County.

Geography

Three major watersheds meet, forming a triple divide, in Potter County: Chesapeake Bay, St. Lawrence River, and Mississippi River. Moreover, the main stem by volume of the entire Mississippi river system, the Allegheny River, has its source in central Potter County, near Cobb Hill.

Potter has a warm-summer humid continental climate (Dfb) and average monthly temperatures in Coudersport range from 22.0 °F in January to 66.4 °F in July.

Adjacent counties
Allegany County, New York (north)
Steuben County, New York (northeast)
Tioga County (east)
Lycoming County (southeast)
Clinton County (south)
Cameron County (southwest)
McKean County (west)

Major highways

Demographics

As of the census of 2000, 18,080 people, 7,005 households, and 5,001 families resided in the county.  The population density was 17 people per square mile (6/km2).  The 12,159 housing units had an average density of 11 per square mile (4/km2).  The racial makeup of the county was 98.06% White, 0.29% African American, 0.22% Native American, 0.50% Asian,  0.22% from other races, and 0.71% from two or more races.  About 0.57% of the population were Hispanics or Latinos of any race. By ancestry, 27.3% were of English, 26.9% were of German, 9.9% Irish and 5.8% Italian.

Of the 7,005 households, 31.5% had children under 18 living with them, 59.5% were married couples living together, 7.6% had a female householder with no husband present, and 28.6% were not families. About 24.7% of all households were made up of individuals, and 11.4% had someone living alone who was 65 or older.  The average household size was 2.54, and the average family size was 3.02.

In Potter County, the age distribution was 26.0% under 18, 6.9% from 18 to 24, 26.1% from 25 to 44, 24.3% from 45 to 64, and 16.7% who were 65 or older.  The median age was 39 years. For every 100 females, there were 97.40 males.  For every 100 females 18 and over, there were 94.80 males.

2020 Census

Politics and government

|}

Politics and elections
Potter County is one of the most Republican counties in Pennsylvania. In 2004, George W. Bush received 5,640 votes (71%) to 2,268 votes (29%) for John Kerry.  The county has voted for the Republican in every presidential election since 1964. In 2006, Rick Santorum received 3,476 votes (63%) to 2,012 votes (37%) for Bob Casey, Jr., making it Santorum's strongest county in his defeat. Lynn Swann also received more than 60% of the Potter County vote in his defeat. In 2016, Donald Trump and Pat Toomey were overwhelmingly elected in Potter County for the U.S. presidential election and U.S. Senate election, respectively. Trump won 80.31% of the vote over Hillary Clinton, while Toomey won 77.79% of the vote over Katie McGinty. In the 2016 state attorney general race, John Rafferty won 79.15% of the vote.

Voter registration
As of February 21, 2022, there are 10,961 registered voters in Potter County.

 Democratic: 2,093 (19.09%)
 Republican: 7,622 (69.54%)
 Independent: 915 (8.35%)
 Third Party: 331 (3.02%)

State Senate
 Cris Dush, Republican, Pennsylvania's 25th Senatorial District

State House of Representatives
 Martin T. Causer, Republican, Pennsylvania's 67th Representative District
 Clinton D. Owlett, Republican, Pennsylvania's 68th Representative District

United States House of Representatives
 Summer Lee, Democrat, Pennsylvania's 12th congressional district

United States Senate
 John Fetterman, Democrat
 Bob Casey, Jr., Democrat

Local government
Potter County constitutes Judicial District 55 in the Unified Judicial System of Pennsylvania. The Court of Common Pleas for District 55 is located in Coudersport, and staffed by a single judge, President Judge Stephen P.B. Minor. Since about 2001, Potter County's Court of Common Pleas has become a center for filing no-fault divorces in Pennsylvania, most of which do not involve any Potter County residents. Under Pennsylvania's unusual venue rules, divorce cases involving a Pennsylvania resident may be filed anywhere in the state so long as neither party objects. As of 2009, the over 6,000 divorces filed per year in Potter County raised several hundred thousand dollars in revenue for the county's general fund.

Education

Public school districts
Austin Area School District
Coudersport Area School District
Galeton Area School District (also in Tioga County)
Keystone Central School District (also in Clinton County)
Northern Potter School District
Oswayo Valley School District (also in McKean County)
Port Allegany School District (also in McKean County)

Private schools
Chestnut Ridge School, Genesee, grades 1–8
Hebron Center Christian School, Coudersport, prekindergarten - grade 12
Meadow View School, Genesee, grades 1–8
Musto Hollow Amish School, Genesee, grades 1–8
Penn-York Camp and Retreat Center, Ulysses
Ulysses Amish School, Ulysses, grades 1–8
List from National Center for Education Statistics

Libraries
Coudersport Public Library 
Galeton Public Library 
Genesee Area Library 
Oswayo Valley Memorial Library, Shinglehouse 
Ulysses Library Association 
Potter-Tioga County Library System, Coudersport

Pennsylvania EdNA – Educational Entities, 2013

Recreation

Potter County is home to 8 state parks and many more acres of state forest and gamelands.
Cherry Springs State Park
Denton Hill State Park
Lyman Run State Park
Ole Bull State Park
Patterson State Park
Prouty Place State Park
Sinnemahoning State Park parts in Cameron County
Sizerville State Park parts in Cameron County
The county is also the location of the annual "God's Country Marathon" race between Galeton and Coudersport.

Communities

Under Pennsylvania law, the four types of incorporated municipalities are cities, boroughs, townships, and in at most two cases, towns. These boroughs and townships are located in Potter County:

Boroughs
Austin
Coudersport (county seat)
Galeton
Oswayo
Shinglehouse
Ulysses

Townships

Abbott
Allegany
Bingham
Clara
Eulalia
Genesee
Harrison
Hebron
Hector
Homer
Keating
Oswayo
Pike
Pleasant Valley
Portage
Roulette
Sharon
Stewardson
Summit
Sweden
Sylvania
Ulysses
West Branch
Wharton

Census-designated places
 Roulette
 Sweden Valley

Unincorporated communities
 Cross Fork
 East Fork Road
 Elmer
 Mills

Road district (defunct)
East Fork Road was a former district that dissolved on January 1, 2004. The district contained only one road and 14 residents, with almost all of the district's land claimed as part of the Susquehannock State Forest. The territory that constituted the East Fork Road District is now the eastern half of Wharton Township.

Population ranking
The population ranking of the following table is based on the 2010 census of Potter County.

† county seat

See also
Austin Dam (until 1911 failure, and afterward until 1942 failure) (in Pennsylvania in the US)
National Register of Historic Places listings in Potter County, Pennsylvania

References

External links
PotterCountyPa.net
Open Access edition of Victor L. Beebe's 1934 History of Potter County Pennsylvania at the Penn State University Library website

 
1826 establishments in Pennsylvania
Counties of Appalachia
Populated places established in 1826